César Romero Zamora (born August 2, 1989) is an American soccer player who plays for San Diego 1904 FC in the National Independent Soccer Association.

Career

Born in Chula Vista, California, Romero began his career in his family's homeland when he was 15 at Tigres UANL in Mexico's reserve league, then spent time playing in the lower leagues of Germany for TSG Thannhausen towards the end of 2010. He was later with Murciélagos of the Segunda División de México in 2011. Romero also spent time playing in the Premier Arena Soccer League for Revolucion Tijuana, where he scored nine goals in one match, and summed 33 goals in four games while playing for the indoor soccer team, breaking a record within the league.  He returned to the United States a few years later and represented the country at several youth levels.

Chivas USA signed Romero on February 22, 2012 after trialling with the club during their pre-season.  Romero made his debut for Chivas USA of Major League Soccer as a 59th-minute substitute during a 1-0 loss against Houston Dynamo on March 11, 2012.  He was released by Chivas USA on February 14, 2013.

In August 2014, following a two-week trial, Romero signed for Armenian Premier League side FC Pyunik. He was the Armenian Premier league top goalscorer for the 2014-2015 season. After the end of the season, he signed with the Bucket Group and transferred to FK Vardar in Macedonia.

On 12 December 2015 Coras de Tepic owner José Luis Higuera announced on his official Twitter account that Romero reached an agreement with him to join the Nayarit-based side. Higuera, who works under C.D. Guadalajara owner Jorge Vergara, also announced that Romero could join Guadalajara in the future if he has good performances with Tepic. Although he was born in the United States, Romero is still eligible to join the club since he was never cap-tied with the senior U.S. national team. Despite playing for U.S. youth squads, he has stated in interviews that he would like to play for the Mexico national team if the opportunity arrives.

On 31 January 2017, Romero signed for Maltese Premier League side Mosta.

Romero returned to Armenia on 7 July 2018, signing for FC Alashkert, but was released from his contract on 1 December 2018.

Romero made his return to the indoor game in 2019 by signing with the San Diego Sockers.

In 2021, Romero joined National Independent Soccer Association side San Diego 1904 FC ahead of the spring 2021 season.

Career statistics

Honours

Club
Pyunik
Armenian Premier League (1): 2014–15
Armenian Independence Cup (1): 2014–15

Individual
2014–15 Armenian Premier League top goalscorer: 27

References

External links
 
 

1989 births
Living people
American soccer players
Chivas USA players
FC Pyunik players
Major League Soccer players
Soccer players from California
Expatriate footballers in Armenia
Armenian Premier League players
FK Vardar players
Expatriate footballers in North Macedonia
American sportspeople of Mexican descent
Association football forwards
San Diego Sockers players
Major Arena Soccer League players